Dick Harris (born July 24, 1937) is a former American football defensive back who played six seasons in the American Football League with the Los Angeles/San Diego Chargers from 1960 to 1965.  He was selected to the 1960 and 1961 AFL All-League teams.  Harris had a total of 25 interceptions in the Chargers' first four seasons.

See also
List of American Football League players

1937 births
Living people
American football defensive backs
Los Angeles Chargers players
San Diego Chargers players
American Football League All-Star players
American Football League All-League players
McNeese Cowboys football players
American Football League players